Eranos is an intellectual discussion group dedicated to humanistic and religious studies, as well as to the natural sciences which has met annually in Moscia (Lago Maggiore), the Collegio Papio and on the Monte Verità in Ascona, Switzerland since 1933.

It has also been the name for a circle of scholars at Heidelberg (Germany) in the early 20th century. Among others, Max Weber and Ernst Troeltsch were members of the "Heidelberg Eranos".

The name is derived from the Ancient Greek word ἔρανος meaning "a banquet to which the guests bring contributions of food, a no-host dinner." The circle at Moscia was founded by Olga Froebe-Kapteyn in 1933, and these conferences have been held annually on the grounds of her estate (on the shores of Lago Maggiore near Ascona in Switzerland) ever since. For over seventy years this event has served as a point of contact for thinkers from disparate fields of knowledge ranging from depth psychology and comparative religion to history, literary criticism and folklore, and provides a setting and a congenial group within which to discuss all things spiritual. Each conference takes place over eight days, during which time all participants eat, sleep and live together, thereby promoting a camaraderie which fosters an atmosphere of free and open discussion. Each year a new theme is addressed, and each participant scholar delivers a two-hour lecture on a topic of his choice relating to the theme — his/her contribution to the ‘banquet’ of ideas — thereby attempting to draw these multifarious thinkers into productive intellectual discourse.

Eranos’ beginnings
Froebe-Kapteyn established this group at the suggestion of the eminent German religious historian, Rudolf Otto. Froebe-Kapteyn was the Dutch foundress of the literary salon "Table Ronde" (Round Table), which is indicative of the Eranos’ ‘spiritualist’ bent. Indeed, Eranos was from its very outset interested in these issues and its first theme, ‘Yoga and Meditation in East and West’, was a truly pioneering subject in the early 1930s. Past themes include Ancient Sun Cults and the Symbolism of Light in the Gnosis and in Early Christianity (1943), Man and Peace (1958), Creation and Organization (1966) and The Truth of Dreams (1995).  Participants over the years have included Heinrich Zimmer (Indian religious art), Karl Kerényi (Greek mythology), Mircea Eliade (history of religions), Carl Gustav Jung and Erich Neumann (analytical psychology), Robert Eisler (gospel authorship), Alfons Rosenberg (symbolism), Gilles Quispel (gnostic studies), Gershom Scholem (Jewish mysticism), Henry Corbin (Islamic religion), Gilbert Durand (symbolic anthropology), Adolf Portmann (biology), Herbert Read (art history), Max Knoll (physics), and Joseph Campbell (comparative mythology). The Eranos conferences have resulted in the publication of a number of books. Anyone may attend the lectures upon payment of a small fee.

References

Further reading
 ERANOS, Neue Folge (New series), 1993ff. Königshausen & Neumann, Wuerzburg, 17 volumes published in 2016. 
 HAKL, Hans Thomas, Der verborgene Geist von Eranos – Unbekannte Begegnungen von Wissenschaft und Esoterik – Eine alternative Geistesgeschichte des 20. Jahrhunderts, Scientia nova-Verlag Neue Wissenschaft, Bretten 2001.
 BERNARDINI, Riccardo, Jung a Eranos. Il progetto della psicologia complessa. FrancoAngeli, Milano 2011,  .
 QUAGLINO, Gian Piero, ROMANO, Augusto, & BERNARDINI, Riccardo (Eds.), Carl Gustav Jung a Eranos 1933-1952, Antigone Edizioni, Torino 2007, .
 REIBNITZ, Barbara von, “Der Eranos-Kreis – Religionswissenschaft und Weltanschauung oder der Gelehrte als Laien-Priester", in: FABER, Richard, & HOLSTE, Christine (Ed.), Kreise, Gruppen, Bünde – Zur Soziologie moderner Intellektuellerassoziation, Könighausen + Neumann, Würzburg 2000, pp. 425–440.
 BARONE, Elisabetta, et al., Pioniere, Poeten, Professoren - Eranos und Monte Verità in der Zivilisationsgeschichte des 20. Jahrhunderts, Königshausen & Neumann, Würzburg 2004 [articles in English, German, Italian].
 SCHABERT, Tilo, "Une herméneutique intercivilisatrice: L`École d`Eranos", in: WEILL, Nicolas (Ed.), Existe-il une Europe philosophique?, Presses Universitaires de Rennes, Rennes 2005, pp.  297–302. 
SCHABERT, Tilo, "The Eranos Experience",in: Barone, Elisabetta et al., Pioniere, Poeten, Professoren, 9-19; online:http://www.eranos.org/content/html/start_english.html 
SCHABERT, Tilo, "In the Fading of Divine Voices: The Song of Eranos", in: Tilo Schabert, Matthias Riedl (Eds.), "Gott oder Götter? - God or Gods?", Königshausen & Neumann, Würzburg 2009, 181-188; online: http://www.eranos.org/content/html/start_english.html
SCHABERT, Tilo, "On the recent history of the Eranos-Tagungen. From Olga Froebe-Kapteyn to the Amici di Eranos", in: Matthias Riedl, Tilo Schabert, (Eds.), "Die Stadt: Achse und Zentrum der Welt - The City: Axis and Centre of the World", Königshausen & Neumann, Würzburg 2011, 133-142; online: http://www.eranos.org/content/pdf/History_of_Eranos_Tagungen.pdf
SCHABERT, Tilo (Ed.) "The Eranos Movement. A Story of Hermeneutics", Königshausen & Neumann, Würzburg, 2016, 202 p., . 
 WASSERSTROM, Steven M., Religion after religion. Gershom Scholem, Mircea Eliade, and Henry Corbin at Eranos, Princeton University Press, Princeton 1999, .
 GASSEAU, Maurizio, & BERNARDINI, Riccardo, "Il sogno: prospettive di Eranos", in: GASSEAU, Maurizio, & BERNARDINI, Riccardo (Eds.), Il sogno. Dalla psicologia analitica allo psicodramma junghiano, FrancoAngeli, Milano 2009, pp. 15–55,  .
See also: "Selected Bibliography", http://www.eranos.org/content/html/start_english.html

External links
Eranos Foundation official website
Eranos Unofficial Site
Eranos.org
Who is who in Analytical Psychology?: Eranos Circle

Conferences
Philosophy events
Critical theory
Cultural history
Analytical psychology
New Age organizations